Al-Jammama was a Palestinian Arab village located in the Negev desert 30 km north west of the city of Beersheba. Its settled population was recorded as six in the 1931 census.

History
The village was an archeological site, containing cisterns, an olive press, mosaic floors, tombs, the crown of a stone column, and stone tools from the Middle Paleolithic period have been found in the vicinity.

An invocation text,  May Allah have mercy on you, Amr b. Sahl al Jahmi, dating from early 2nd century A.H./ 9th century C.E., was found  by the remnants of an ancient bath in Al-Jammama. The inscription is presently in Kibbutz Ruhama. 

A construction text, for the construction of a cistern or a well,  dating to late 5th AH/11th century CE, has also been found at Al-Jammama.

Ottoman era
In 1863, Victor Guérin described it as an ’inconsiderable’ ruin.

In 1883, the PEF's Survey of Western Palestine (SWP) found at Khurbet Jemmameh: "Remains of a ruined village, about 20 houses. Rubble cisterns. A spring well, dry in summer. An olive press and a piece of tesselated pavement."

British Mandate era
At the end of World War I, on 8 November 1917, the British defeated the Ottoman force in Al-Jammama, which resulted in a British occupation of the village.  In the 1931 census  it had 6 inhabitants; all Muslim, in 1 house.

Al-Jammama had an elementary school, which was founded in 1944. The kibbutz of Ruhama was also established in 1944 on the village's land.

Israel

During the 1948 Arab–Israeli War it was captured by Israel's Negev and Givati brigades on May 22, 1948, and its inhabitants were expelled. Following the war the area was incorporated into the State of Israel.

According to the Palestinian historian Walid Khalidi, the  remaining structures on the village land were in 1992: "A few walls remain on the slopes of hills, surrounded by shrubs and thorns. Cactuses and gum trees grow on the site. The site is used for animal grazing; it also has a stable for horses. The surrounding lands are used for agriculture.  Bedouin still camp near the site occasionally to take advantage of nearby pasture."

References

Bibliography

External links
Welcome to al-Jammama
al-Jammama,  Zochrot
Survey of Western Palestine, Map 20:   IAA, Wikimedia commons 
Al- Jammama, from the Khalil Sakakini Cultural Center
Map, 1946

Arab villages depopulated during the 1948 Arab–Israeli War
District of Beersheba